Dinochloa sipitangensis a species of tropical clumping high-climbing bamboos in the grass family.

They are found in the hill forests and lowland dipterocarp forest of Borneo, in Sabah. The species was identified by Indonesia-born British plant taxonomist, Soejatmi Dransfield, in 1981 and named after the locality, Sipitang, in which it was found.

They have zigzag culms and bare fleshy fruits.

References 

Bambusoideae
Flora of Borneo